5-hydroxymethylcytosine binding, ES cell specific is a protein that in humans is encoded by the HMCES gene.

References

Further reading 

</ref>